Ji Pengfei (simplified Chinese: 姬鹏飞; traditional Chinese: 姬鵬飛; pinyin: Jī Péngfēi; February 2, 1910 – February 10, 2000) was a Chinese politician.

Biography
Ji Pengfei was born in Linyi, Yuncheng, Shanxi in 1910. He joined the Chinese Red Army in 1931, and the Chinese Communist Party in 1933.

After the establishment of the People's Republic of China, Ji Pengfei worked with the Ministry of Foreign Affairs, and led diplomatic missions to the German Democratic Republic before being appointed as China's first ambassador to the GDR in 1953, being the youngest Chinese ambassador at 43. He was recalled to serve as vice-minister of Foreign Affairs in 1955.

When the Cultural Revolution broke out, he was initially targeted as member of the counter-revolutionary clique ruling the Foreign Ministry, along with Chen Yi and Qiao Guanhua. Nevertheless, he was relatively untouched as he remained at his post. After Chen Yi died in 1972, Ji Pengfei succeeded him as Foreign Minister until 1974, and was elected CCP Central Committee member. He was appointed secretary-general of the Standing Committee of the National People's Congress in 1975, and confirmed in 1978.  In 1972, he signed Japan-China Joint Communiqué with Prime Minister Kakuei Tanaka and Foreign Minister Masayoshi Ohira of Japan.

In the post-Cultural Revolution period, Ji Pengfei held several posts. In 1979 he was appointed head of the International Liaison Department of the CCP Central Committee, then vice-premier and secretary-general of the State Council from 1980 to 1982, and finally head of the Hong Kong and Macau Affairs Office. He also served as Standing Committee member of the Central Advisory Commission, a Party body aimed at helping the retirement of elder officials.

In 1999, his son, Ji Shengde, a senior member of the People's Liberation Army intelligence, was arrested and tried for corruption, selling classified information and diverting public funds, and was sentenced to death penalty.  The penalty was commuted to 20 years in prison, when he returned stolen money and denounce other abuses.

Ji Pengfei was praised by the Xinhua News Agency as an outstanding communist fighter, and greatly lauded again in 2010 at a ceremony in the Great Hall of the People to celebrate his 100th birth anniversary.

External links

http://www.britannica.com/eb/topic-713327/Ji-Pengfei
http://www.fmprc.gov.cn/eng/ziliao/wjrw/3606/t44149.htm

|-

|-

|-

|-

|-

|-

Foreign Ministers of the People's Republic of China
Chinese Communist Party politicians from Shanxi
People's Republic of China politicians from Shanxi
New Fourth Army generals
1910 births
2000 deaths
Ambassadors of China to East Germany
Hong Kong Basic Law Drafting Committee members
Generals from Shanxi
Politicians from Yuncheng
20th-century Chinese politicians
State councillors of China
Vice Chairpersons of the National People's Congress
Burials at Babaoshan Revolutionary Cemetery